The Maya (Maaya) is a river in Khabarovsk Krai and Sakha, Russia. It is a right tributary of the Aldan of the Lena basin. The area of its basin . The Maya freezes up in late October and stays under the ice until May. The Yudoma is one of the biggest tributaries of the Maya.

The Yudoma-Maya Highlands are located in the basin of the Maya. 

The Maya was part of the river route from Yakutsk to the Okhotsk Coast. Its course is approximately "V"-shaped. About  from its source the Mati River comes in from the south. From the Mati either the Lama Portage or the Alanchak Portage led to the Ulya and the coast. Near the southernmost point was the settlement of Nelkan from which a track led over the mountains to Ayan. The Maya flows west for perhaps  and receives the Maimakan River from the southwest. From Ust-Maya there was a horse-track to Yakutsk. Eastbound boats that reached Ust-Maya from the Lena were replaced by smaller boats to continue up the Maya.

References

Rivers of the Sakha Republic
Rivers of Khabarovsk Krai